North Hopkins Independent School District is a public school district located in North Central Hopkins County, Texas (USA).

In 2009, the school district was rated "academically acceptable" by the Texas Education Agency.

Schools
North Hopkins High School (Grades 7-12)
North Hopkins Elementary School (Grades PK-6)

North Hopkins Varsity Volleyball team were District Champs, Bi-District Champs and Area Qualifiers in the 2015–2016 season

References

External links
North Hopkins ISD

School districts in Hopkins County, Texas